Anomala sulcatula, commonly known as the Philippine chafer, is a species of shining leaf chafers in the genus Anomala. It is considered as a pest as its larvae feed on sugarcane, rice, corn and maize.

Description 
An adult Philippine chafer has an ovate body whose length ranges from 14-18 mm. It has a slightly metallic near-black brown color. The larva of a Philippine chafer has a C-shaped, cylindrical, white-colored body.

Distribution 
Anomala sulcatula is native to the Philippines but has been introduced to Guam, the northern Mariana Islands and Borneo as an invasive species.

References 

Rutelinae
Agricultural pest insects
Insects of the Philippines
Beetles described in 1844